Matthew Fry may refer to:

 Matthew Wyatt Joseph Fry (1863–1943), an Irish mathematician and academic
 Matt Fry (born 1990), an English semi-professional footballer

See also
 Matt Frei (born 1963; homophone of Fry), British journalist and broadcaster